The Sella Towers are four summits in the Sella group in South Tyrol, Italy.

References 
 Egon Pracht: Alpenvereinsführer Dolomiten Sellagruppe. Bergverlag Rudolf Rother, München 1980,

External links 

Mountains of the Alps
Mountains of South Tyrol
Dolomites